Joy E Newman (born 17 November 1945) is a British former diver.

Diving career
She competed in the 1964 Summer Olympics.

She represented England in the 10 metres platform at the 1962 British Empire and Commonwealth Games in Perth, Western Australia. Four years later she returned to compete in the same event and this time won the gold medal at the 1966 British Empire and Commonwealth Games in Kingston, Jamaica.

References

1945 births
Living people
British female divers
Olympic divers of Great Britain
Divers at the 1964 Summer Olympics
Divers at the 1962 British Empire and Commonwealth Games
Divers at the 1966 British Empire and Commonwealth Games
Commonwealth Games medallists in diving
Commonwealth Games gold medallists for England
Universiade medalists in diving
Universiade gold medalists for Great Britain
Medalists at the 1965 Summer Universiade
Medallists at the 1966 British Empire and Commonwealth Games